Serenjianeh Sofla (also Romanized as Serenjīāneh Soflá; also known as Serenjīāneh Pā’īn, Serīnjīāneh-ye Pā'īn, and Sīrīnjīāneh-ye Pā’īn) is a village in Naran Rural District, in the Central District of Sanandaj County, Kurdistan Province, Iran. At the 2006 census, its population was 609, in 142 families. The village is populated by Kurds.

References 

Towns and villages in Sanandaj County
Kurdish settlements in Kurdistan Province